Mysłów may refer to the following places in Poland:
Mysłów, Lower Silesian Voivodeship (south-west Poland)
Mysłów, Lublin Voivodeship (east Poland)
Mysłów, Silesian Voivodeship (south Poland)